Ali Abed El Hasan Fayad (born 22 March 1991) is a Lebanese former footballer who played as a midfielder. He is the founder and president of "Peña Madridista Beirut", a Lebanese fan club of Real Madrid.

Club career 
Coming through the youth system, Fayad began his career with Ahed in 2009. In his two years at Ahed, he won two Lebanese Premier League titles, one Lebanese FA Cup and one Lebanese Super Cup. Fayad then joined Lebanese Premier League side Mabarra on loan ahead of the 2011–12 season. He moved to Racing Beirut in 2011, scoring his first goal in January 2014 against Tadamon Sour.

In September 2015, Fayad left Racing. He joined Chabab Ghazieh in October 2015 on a one-year contract, scoring on his first touch his debut against Salam Zgharta on 17 October 2015. Fayad also played for Sagesse in the 2016–17 Lebanese Second Division, and for Shabab Arabi, with whom he retired in 2017 due to injury-related problems.

International career 
Fayad represented Lebanon internationally at under-19 level in 2009.

Post-playing career 
In 2017, Fayad founded "Peña Madridista Beirut", a club for Real Madrid fans in Lebanon. He had an important role in organising the legends of Real Madrid and Barcelona "El Clásico" friendly match in Lebanon the same year. The fan club was officially affiliated to Real Madrid in December 2020.

Other activities 
Fayad was the main editor of Yusif, a 2021 feature narrative film directed by his brother Kazim. The film won the Special Jury Award at the Asian World Film Festival, and was the best first cinematic work at the Alexandria Mediterranean Film Festival.

Honours 
Ahed
 Lebanese Premier League: 2009–10, 2010–11
 Lebanese FA Cup: 2010–11
 Lebanese Elite Cup: 2010
 Lebanese Super Cup: 2010

References

External links 

 
 
 

1991 births
Living people
Footballers from Beirut
Lebanese footballers
Association football midfielders
Al Ahed FC players
Al Mabarra Club players
Racing Club Beirut players
Chabab Ghazieh SC players
Sagesse SC footballers
Al Shabab Al Arabi Club Beirut players
Lebanese Premier League players
Lebanese Second Division players
Lebanon youth international footballers